Dhankundi Shahnaj Siraj High School is a secondary school at Dhankundi, Sherpur Upazila, Bogra District, Bangladesh, established in 1992.

The school is recognized by the Board of Intermediate and Secondary Education, Rajshahi. The average graduating class has 400 to 600 students. It is a combined school.

The school has a campus with a playground for soccer, basketball, cricket, volleyball, and badminton. The basketball court serves as a multipurpose auditorium.

Literacy school
Dhankundi Shahnaj Siraj High School also provides education for underprivileged children, known as the "Literacy School". The classes go into session after the regular classes break. Although the administration is the same for both schools, the literacy classes and activities are conducted under a different faculty that has no affiliation with the regular branch. Students of the regular school often volunteer as teachers for the literacy school.

Selection of students
Students are generally chosen for Grade 3 through an admission test. The students who score the highest are admitted in the school. Generally around 165 students from 900 to 1000 are admitted each year, around 55 for each of three sections.

Lab facilities
Facilities include two computer labs equipped with multimedia projectors, an internet lab, two chemistry labs, two physics labs and two biology labs.

References

External links
 

Schools in Bogra District